Turmstraße  is a Berlin U-Bahn station located on the  line. The station is located in fare zone A. It was opened on 28 August 1961, and designed by B. Grimmek.

Turmstraße was originally built with an extra rail track under U5; it is no longer used due to technical issues.

In the station list of the BVG the station bears the designation Tm. In the construction of the station, the possibility of interchange to line U5 has been taken into account. For this, a tunnel and platform was constructed but not used. To facilitate changing to buses, a central exit was subsequently built in the area of the U5 platform, which comes to the surface on the south side of Turmstraße.

The train station is 675 meters from Birkenstraße and 919 meters from Hansaplatz. The station is under the Kleiner Tiergarten park between Turmstraße and Alt-Moabit. The costs amounted to 1.8 million euros.

In the immediate vicinity of the underground station is the operating school underground of the BVG and the control center for monitoring and switching the driving current in the subway network.

References

U9 (Berlin U-Bahn) stations
Buildings and structures in Mitte
Railway stations in Germany opened in 1961